Jazestan (also Romanized as Jāzestān) is a village in Margha Rural District, in the Central District of Izeh County, Khuzestan Province, Iran. At the 2006 census, its population was 231, in 38 families.

References 

Populated places in Izeh County